Schizomus kharagpurensis is a species of short-tailed whipscorpions of the genus Schizomus that belong to the family Hubbardiidae of Arachnids. It is found in India and is named after the city of Kharagpur, West Bengal.

References 

Schizomida
Animals described in 1912